B. J. Emmons (born July 3, 1997) is an American football running back who is currently a member of the Saskatchewan Roughriders of the Canadian Football League (CFL). He played college football at Florida Atlantic, Hutchinson Community College, and Alabama. Emmons has also been a member four different NFL teams; the Seattle Seahawks, Las Vegas Raiders, Jacksonville Jaguars, and Houston Texans. In the USFL he played for the Tampa Bay Bandits.

Early life and high school career
Emmons attended Freedom High School in Morganton, North Carolina. He rushed for 2,348 yards and 38 touchdowns as a junior. As a senior, he ran for 2,417 yards and 41 touchdowns. Emmons also tallied 123 receiving yards and a touchdown and scored on two punt returns, a kickoff return and an interception return. He was named Northwestern 3A/4A Conference offensive player of the year as well as being selected to the NCPreps.com all-state team, helping the Patriots win their third consecutive league title.

Emmons was regarded as a four-star prospect ranked No. 94 overall in the 247Sports Composite rankings. He originally committed to Georgia in December 2014, but decommitted on June 11, 2015, after improving his academics and receiving more offers. On July 20, Emmons committed to Alabama.

College career
Emmons played seven games for Alabama in 2016, rushing for 173 yards and a touchdown on 35 carries. He suffered a season-ending foot injury roughly halfway through the season. Emmons opted to transfer following the season. He transferred to Hutchinson Community College and ran for 694 yards and 10 touchdowns on 150 carries in 2017. Emmons did not play in 2018, and transferred to Florida Atlantic in 2019. He broke his ankle in his first game and was sidelined for the majority of the season before returning for the Conference USA Championship Game and had two touchdowns against UAB. As a junior, Emmons had 51 carries for 237 yards and six touchdowns. He played four games in 2020 and had 116 yards and one touchdown.

Professional career

Seattle Seahawks
On May 1, 2021, Emmons was signed by the Seattle Seahawks as an undrafted free agent. He was waived on June 18.

Las Vegas Raiders
On July 29, 2021, Emmons was signed by the Las Vegas Raiders. He rushed for 90 yards and a touchdown on 24 carries in three preseason games, but did not make the final roster and was signed to the practice squad. Emmons was released on September 6.

Seattle Seahawks (II)
On November 24, 2021, Emmons was signed to the Seattle Seahawks' practice squad. He was waived on November 30.

Jacksonville Jaguars
On December 7, 2021, Emmons was signed to the Jacksonville Jaguars' practice squad. He was released on January 4, 2022.

Tampa Bay Bandits
Emmons was selected with the first pick of the 27th round of the 2022 USFL Draft by the Tampa Bay Bandits. He was ruled inactive for the team's game against the Michigan Panthers on May 13, 2022. He was moved back to the active roster on May 20.

Houston Texans
On August 10, 2022, Emmons signed with the Houston Texans. He was waived five days later.

Saskatchewan Roughriders 
On October 2, 2022, Emmons signed with the Saskatchewan Roughriders of the Canadian Football League (CFL). He spent several weeks on the practice roster and did not dress for a regular season game. In January 2023, Emmons and the Riders agreed to a contract extension.

References

External links
Alabama Crimson Tide bio
Florida Atlantic Owls bio

1997 births
Living people
Players of American football from North Carolina
African-American players of American football
American football running backs
Alabama Crimson Tide football players
Hutchinson Blue Dragons football players
Florida Atlantic Owls football players
Las Vegas Raiders players
Seattle Seahawks players
Jacksonville Jaguars players
21st-century African-American sportspeople
People from Morganton, North Carolina
Tampa Bay Bandits (2022) players
Houston Texans players